Tomislav "Tole lopove" Karadžić (born 10 February 1939) is a Serbian businessman and football administrator. From 2008 to 2016, he served in his second stint as the president of the Football Association of Serbia (FSS).

Career 
From 2005 until 2006 Karadžić was the president of Serbian and Montenegrin Football Association (FSSCG). Prior to that he was the president of the regional FA (Football Association of Vojvodina), the job he performed for 18 years.  On 25 September 2007, Karadžić became the president of Partizan Belgrade where he came following the decades-long reign of Nenad Bjeković, Žarko Zečević, and Ivan Ćurković at the club.

Simultaneously, Karadžić kept a position at the Serbian FA where he was a deputy to the association's president Zvezdan Terzić. In March 2008, Terzić fled the country after getting indicted for embezzlement of player transfer funds and Karadžić took over his role as FA president. During summer 2008 new elections were held for the FSS presidency. Karadžić beat out Dragan Aca Bulić.

Controversy and criticism

1961 prison stay
During his university days in Belgrade, after beating up a fellow student in the faculty commissary and causing him injuries that reportedly led to the victim losing an eye, twenty-two-year-old Karadžić was charged with aggravated assault in 1961 and sentenced to a year-and-a-half prison term. However, under unclear circumstances, Karadžić was released after only 6 months in the Spuž prison.

The incident briefly came back into public focus during August 2013 while Karadžić publicly clashed with the Red Star Belgrade club vice-president Nebojša Čović over ongoing Serbian SuperLiga administrative issues.

Irregularities in player sales and match-fixing 
For many years, Karadžić has been heavily criticized by public due to various reasons and decisions, which had catastrophic consequences for the Serbian football. After numerous serious irregularities in player sales (mostly for young players), serious suspicions of match-fixing, and an impending boycott of the Serbian top club Red Star Belgrade combined with sharp criticism of over half of the clubs in Serbian SuperLiga, Karadžić announced his resignation in late 2013.

When criticism became public, he was in Budva on holiday, so therefore he didn't comment it in details, but referred to his critics as criminals. His adversary Zvezdan Terzic — a football administrator who also drew strong criticism by Serbian public for of similar reasons — called for the convening of a special meeting of the Federation Parliament and the immediate withdrawal. However, Karadžić not resigned and since then is even more under criticism. Accusations against him for administrative abuse, monopoly, and clientelism have been continued.

Chants against Karadžić 
For a certain time, during the league matches, fans frequently start a chant against him which says "Tole, lopove!" (Tole, you are a thief!), and these are often supporters of both teams playing, even the fans of the biggest Serbian clubs and eternal rivals, Delije and Grobari. These chants have been sung even during the matches of the Serbian national team.

References

1939 births
Living people
People from Šavnik
Serbs of Montenegro
Serbian people of Montenegrin descent
20th-century Serbian businesspeople
FK Partizan presidents
Serbian sports executives and administrators
Presidents of the Football Association of Serbia